The Serpent & the Sphere is the fifth and final studio album by American heavy metal band Agalloch. It was released on May 13, 2014 in the U.S., followed by releases on May 16 in Germany and May 19 in Europe.

Reception

The album received mostly positive reviews. Michael Toland of The Austin Chronicle described the album as "one boot in balmy progressive folk and the other in frigid black metal" with "some of its prettiest, most haunted acoustic textures and heaviest, raspiest roars". Kim Kelly of Spin stated that the band's "blackened sound" is "more pronounced than ever" while describing the production as "impeccable: Agalloch have never sounded so rich, so full".

Track listing

Personnel
Agalloch
John Haughm – guitars, acoustic guitar, vocals, whisper, percussion, art direction
Don Anderson – guitars, piano, keyboards
Jason William Walton – bass
Aesop Dekker – drums

Guest musicians
Nathanaël Larochette (Musk Ox) – acoustic guitars 

Technical
Justin Weis – mastering
Veleda Thorsson – photography
Billy Anderson – production

References

2014 albums
Agalloch albums
Profound Lore Records albums